Susan Wilson Solovic (born 1958 as Susan Wilson) is an American entrepreneur and author.  Solovic's book "It's Your Biz" became a New York Times, Wall Street Journal, Amazon.com Top 100 and USA Today bestseller.  She has also written two best-selling books on women and business and she is a regular contributor on Fox Business and is ABC's Small Business Contributor and was a former contributor to ABC's America This Morning and Money Matters, MSNBC's Your Business and Fox-TV's Good Day New York, as well as other local and national television and radio programs and blogs.

Career

Miss Missouri
As the winner of the 1979 Miss Missouri pageant, Solovic (as Susan Wilson) represented the state of Missouri in the 1980 Miss America pageant; she placed as the third runner-up.

Television
Solovic began her professional career as a television news anchor and reporter for NBC, CBS and PBS affiliates. In 1983, she was recruited by Southwestern Bell to create, produce and host a company video magazine. She won numerous awards for her work, including an Emmy Award in 1986. 
In 1989, Solovic joined ITT Commercial Finance, an international asset-based lending firm headquartered in St. Louis as vice president, director of corporate marketing – the first female executive in the Commercial Finance Division and one of the highest-ranking women at ITT Corporation. While at ITT, she attended St. Louis University School of Law, graduating with honors.

Solovic is the former CEO and a featured host of the web-based Small Business Television (SBTV.com).

Current activities
In 2004, Solovic was appointed to the National Women's Business Council to advise Congress, the President and the United States Small Business Administration on economic issues relevant to women business owners. She sat on the boards of the John F. Kennedy School of Government (Women's Leadership Board) at Harvard University and the John Cook School of Business Entrepreneurial Studies at St. Louis University. She chairs the advisory board for Women Impacting Public Policy.

Awards
Enterprising Woman of the Year, Enterprising Women Magazine (2007)
Influential Women in St. Louis (2004)
YWCA Special Business Leader Award for Entrepreneurial Success (2004)
Stevie Award for the Most Innovative Company up to 100 Employees
Institute for Women Entrepreneurs Leaders of Distinction
Emmy Award (1986)
SBA Small Business Journalist of the Year (2009)
National Association of Women Business Owners, Small Business Journalist (2009)

Books
Reinvent Your Career: Attain the Success You Desire and Deserve (2003) 
The Girl’s Guide to Power and Success (2003) 
Hanging Onto the American Dream: A story of business leadership and leaving a legacy  (2004) 
The Girl’s Guide to Building a Million-Dollar Business (2007) 
It's Your Biz: The Complete Guide to Becoming Your Own Boss (2011)

References

External links
 Susan Solovic Online Solovic's website
 Solovic’s Column on the Huffington Post
 Solovic’s column on the CEOWORLD magazine
Business Matters video podcast
Susan Wilson Solovic guest stars as herself in the satiric web series Lester & Charlie

American finance and investment writers
American self-help writers
American women in business
Harvard Kennedy School people
Emmy Award winners
Living people
Miss America 1980s delegates
Businesspeople from St. Louis
Saint Louis University School of Law alumni
1958 births
Writers from St. Louis
21st-century American women